Dr. Feelgood may refer to:

Music
Dr. Feelgood (band), a British pub rock band
Dr. Feelgood, recording and alternative stage name of American blues musician Piano Red (1911–1985), who also recorded as Dr. Feelgood and the Interns 
Dr. Feelgood (album), a 1989 album by the American band Mötley Crüe
"Dr. Feelgood (Love Is a Serious Business)", a song from the 1967 album I Never Loved a Man the Way I Love You by Aretha Franklin
"Dr. Feelgood" (Mötley Crüe song), 1989
"Dr. Feelgood" (Cool James and Black Teacher song), 1994
"Dr Feelgood", a 2003 song by the Swedish DJ Interphace. The song appeared on the 2005 album Injected Movements by Interphace.
"Dr. Feel Good", a 2010 song by Travie McCoy on the album Lazarus

People
Robert Freymann, German-born Manhattan physician, the possible subject of the Beatles song "Doctor Robert" 
Max Jacobson, John F. Kennedy's personal physician
George C. Nichopoulos, Elvis Presley's personal physician

Other uses
"Dr. Feelgood", an episode of the TV show Moonlight